Hypomasticus is a genus of headstander native to tropical South America.

Species
There are currently 10 recognized species in this genus:
 Hypomasticus copelandii
Hypomasticus despaxi (Puyo, 1943)
 Hypomasticus julii (dos Santos, Jégu & A. C. Lima, 1996)
 Hypomasticus lineomaculatus Birindelli, L. A. W. Peixoto, Wosiacki & Britski, 2013
 Hypomasticus megalepis (Günther, 1863)
 Hypomasticus mormyrops (Steindachner, 1875)
 Hypomasticus pachycheilus (Britski, 1976)
Hypomasticus santanai 
Hypomasticus steindachneri (C. H. Eigenmann, 1907)
Hypomasticus thayeri (Borodin, 1929)

References

Anostomidae
Taxa named by Nikolai Andreyevich Borodin
Fish of South America